Summer Offensive may refer to:
 Kerensky offensive, 1917
 Greek Summer Offensive, 1920
 1993 Summer Offensives
 2021 Taliban offensive
 Summer Offensive (comics), a 1993 event in 2000 AD (comics)